Jake Joseph Clifford Adelson (born 11 January 1996) is an Australian professional footballer who last played as a right back or right winger for Newcastle Jets.

Adelson played youth football in England with Everton before returning to Australia play for Western Sydney Wanderers' youth team. He made his professional debut for Central Coast Mariners in the A-League in 2015, before joining Newcastle Jets in 2017.

Adelson has represented the Australian under-20 national team.

Club career
Adelson began his youth career with Blacktown City FC before signing for the Everton F.C. Academy as a sixteen year old. After playing for the U-18's and U-21's at Finch Farm, Adelson wasn't able to break into the first team or sign elsewhere in England (which included a trial at Huddersfield F.C. among others), so he decided to return to Sydney, signing with the Western Sydney Wanderers Youth squad. At season's end, Adelson trialled with Newcastle Jets FC before signing with Central Coast Mariners.

Adelson made his first professional team debut for Central Coast Mariners in the Round 7 2015–16 A-League clash versus Melbourne Victory at AAMI Park. Adelson was deployed as right winger, though he has stated his preference is to play right fullback.

Adelson was released by the Mariners in July 2017, after the 2016–17 season. He signed a two-year contract with Newcastle Jets later that month. Adelson made his first appearance for the Jets coming on as a substitute against Melbourne City in a 3–1 victory on 15 February 2019.

References

External links

1996 births
Living people
Association football midfielders
Australian soccer players
Australia under-20 international soccer players
Everton F.C. players
Western Sydney Wanderers FC players
Central Coast Mariners FC players
Newcastle Jets FC players
A-League Men players